George Bertram may refer to:
George Hope Bertram (1847–1900), Scottish-Canadian businessman and politician
George Bertram (footballer, born 1896), (1896–1963), English footballer for Fulham, Brentford
George Bertram (footballer, born 1908), (1908–1972), Scottish footballer for Airdrieonians

See also
Bertram (name)